Ian Harrison MBE (21 March 1937 – 26 August 2016) was a British Paralympic sailor who won gold at the 1996 Summer Paralympics, where the sport made it Paralympic debut. His legacy was the formation of the Sailability the International Foundation for Disabled Sailing it inclusion of the sport within the paralympics and working with World Sailing on integration of disabled sports. In achieve this he has been recognised at various stage when in 1988, he was awarded an MBE (Member of the British Empire). In 2005, Ian was awarded the IPC Paralympic Order and awarded the World Sailing Long Service Gold Medal.

References

External links
 
 

1937 births
2016 deaths
British sailors
English male sailors (sport)
Sonar class sailors
2.4 Metre class sailors
Paralympic sailors of Great Britain
Paralympic gold medalists for Great Britain
Paralympic medalists in sailing
Sailors at the 1996 Summer Paralympics
Medalists at the 1996 Summer Paralympics
Members of the Order of the British Empire